Poecilostachys is a genus of African plants in the grass family, several of the species found only in Madagascar.

 Species

 formerly included
see Oplismenus 
 Poecilostachys stapfii - Oplismenus flavicomus

References

Poaceae genera
Grasses of Africa
Endemic flora of Madagascar
Panicoideae
Taxa named by Eduard Hackel